MOI is a computer file format used primarily to represent information. MOI files are associated with MOD or TOD files whose content they represent. They are mainly used on JVC and Canon camcorders.

Format overview 

Computer file formats